Rami Kaib (born 8 May 1997) is a Tunisian professional footballer who plays as a left-back for Eredivisie club SC Heerenveen. Kaib was born in Sweden and has Tunisian heritage; he represented his native country internationally at under-19 level, before being called up to the Tunisia national team in 2022.

Club career
On 13 January 2021, Kaib joined Eredivisie side Heerenveen on a four-and-a-half-year deal.

International career
Born in Sweden, Kaib is of Tunisian descent from his father, and Lebanese from his mother. He has represented Sweden at under-19 level and, despite being eligible to also represent Tunisia and Lebanon, has stated that he has "ambitions to play for the Swedish national team", and that he had no intention of representing Lebanon.

In May 2022, the Tunisian Football Federation announced that Kaib had signed the documents in order to play for the Tunisia national team.

References

External links
 
 

1997 births
Living people
People from Nyköping Municipality
Sportspeople from Södermanland County
Swedish people of Tunisian descent
Swedish people of Lebanese descent
Tunisian people of Lebanese descent
Sportspeople of Tunisian descent
Sportspeople of Lebanese descent
Swedish footballers
Tunisian footballers
Association football fullbacks
IF Elfsborg players
SC Heerenveen players
Allsvenskan players
Eredivisie players
Sweden youth international footballers

Swedish expatriate footballers
Swedish expatriate sportspeople in the Netherlands
Tunisian expatriate footballers
Tunisian expatriate sportspeople in the Netherlands
Expatriate footballers in the Netherlands